Zampatti is a surname. Notable people with the surname include:

 Carla Zampatti (1942–2021), Australian fashion designer
 Luciano Zampatti (1903–1957), Italian ski jumper

Italian-language surnames